Winalagalis is a war god of the Kwakwaka'wakw native people of British Columbia.  He travels the world, making war. Winalagilis comes from North (underworld) to winter with the Kwakwaka'wakw (formerly known, incorrectly, as the Kwakiutl). (Locher p. 24-25)  Winalagalis is the bringer and ruler of Tseka (Winter Ceremonial), and imbues red cedar bark with supernatural power.

Winalagalis is associated with a magical war canoe (alternately described as made of copper, a sisiutl, invisible, able to travel underground, & permanently fused with Winalagalis).  He is also described as thin, tall, black, with bat-like eyes. (Jonaitis 100)

Winalagalis' ceremonies include the Tuxwid and Hawinalal warrior invincibility dances, and the ma'maka (disease thrower) dance.  In the Hawinalal, dancers don sisiutl girdles, are pierced through back & thigh skin with skewers, and suspended from the rafters of the plank house to demonstrate invincibility & immunity from pain (Boas, "Social Organization...", p. 485).

He is announced by whistles & bull-roarers (the voice of Winalagalis).

See also
Sisiutl
Dantsikw
Winalagalis Treaty Group

References

Boas, Franz. "Kwakiutl Ethnography." 1966. University of Chicago Press. London.
Boas, Franz. "Social Organization and the Secret Societies of the Kwakiutl Indians." 1897. Smithsonian Institution. Washington D.C.
Jonaitis, Aldona, ed. "Chiefly Feasts: The Enduring Kwakiutl Potltach." 1991. AMHH. Seattle.
Locher, Gottfried Wilhelm.  "The Serpent in Kwakiutl Religion: A Study in Primitive Culture".1932. E.J. Brill. Holland.

Kwakwaka'wakw gods
Legendary serpents
Nuu-chah-nulth mythology
War gods